Mike Williams or Mikey Williams may refer to:

Sportspeople

American football
Mike Williams (cornerback) (born 1953), American cornerback
Mike Williams (American football coach) (born 1954), American football coach at Jacksonville State University
Mike Williams (American football, born 1957) (1957–2013), American tight end and fullback who played for the Kansas City Chiefs
Mike Williams (tight end) (born 1959), American tight end who played for the Washington Redskins
Mike Williams (wide receiver, born 1966), American wide receiver who played for the Detroit Lions and Miami Dolphins
Mike Williams (offensive lineman) (born 1980), American offensive lineman
Mike Williams (wide receiver, born 1984), American wide receiver who played collegiately for USC
Mike Williams (wide receiver, born 1987), American wide receiver who played collegiately for Syracuse
Mike Williams (wide receiver, born 1994), American wide receiver for the Los Angeles Chargers

Association football
Mike Williams (footballer, born 1956), Welsh football player for Wrexham and Bangor City
Mike Williams (footballer, born 1965), Welsh football player for Chester City and Wrexham
Mike Williams (footballer, born 1969), English football player
Mike Williams (footballer, born 1986), Welsh football player for Wrexham and Altrincham

Basketball
Mike Williams (basketball) (born 1963), American basketball player
Mikey Williams (basketball, born 1991), Filipino-American basketball player
Mikey Williams (basketball, born 2004), American basketball player

Other sports
Mike Williams (baseball) (born 1968), American baseball player
Mike Williams (boxer) (born 1962), American boxer
Mike Williams (rugby union) (born 1991), Zimbabwean rugby player

Musicians
Mike Will Made It (born 1989), hip-hop producer
Mike Williams (singer) (born 1968), singer for Eyehategod
Mike Williams (trumpeter), lead trumpet for the Count Basie Orchestra
Mike Williams (DJ) (born 1996), electronic music producer
Mike Williams, vocalist for The Agony Scene
Mike Williams, former bassist for Project 86

Others
Jerry Michael Williams, sometimes known as Mike, a Florida man who was murdered in 2000
Mike Williams (New Zealand politician) (born 1949), former President of the New Zealand Labour Party
Mike Williams (journalist) (born 1979), British music journalist and current editor of NME
Mike Williams, deputy of "Wild Bill" Hickok who was accidentally shot and killed by Wild Bill
Mike Williams, former President and CEO of Fannie Mae
Mike Williams, lawyer and assistant to Daniel Fried
Mike Williams, of Plastiq Musiq, American retailer of electronic pop music
Mike Williams, American experimental particle physicist

See also
Michael Williams (disambiguation)